The Berenberg Masters was a men's golf tournament on the European Senior Tour. The tournament was held from 2010 to 2013. It was sponsored by and named for Berenberg Bank.

The first edition was played at The Links at Fancourt, George, South Africa, after which it moved to Germany. It was played at the Cologne Golf and Country Club, Bergisch Gladbach, Cologne in 2011, at Wörthsee Golf Club, Wörthsee near Munich in 2012 before returning to Cologne Golf and Country Club in 2013. The prize fund was €500,000 in 2010 and €400,000 from 2011 to 2013. The 2012 tournament was won by Tim Thelen; his first European Senior Tour win.

Winners

External links
Coverage on the European Senior Tour's official site

Former European Senior Tour events
Golf tournaments in Germany
Golf tournaments in South Africa
Recurring sporting events established in 2010
Recurring sporting events disestablished in 2013